There are at least 158 named lakes and reservoirs in Madison County, Montana.

Lakes
 Alp Lake, el. 
 Avalanche Lake, el. 
 Axolotl Lake, el. 
 Axolotl Lakes, el. 
 Beall Lake, el. 
 Beehive Lake, el. 
 Big Brother Lake, el. 
 Blossom Lake, el. 
 Blue Danube Lake, el. 
 Blue Lake, el. 
 Blue Lake, el. 
 Blue Paradise Lake, el. 
 Branham Lakes, el. 
 Brannan Lakes, el. 
 Cataract Lake, el. 
 Cataract Lake, el. 
 Cherry Lake, el. 
 Cherry Lakes, el. 
 Chilled Lakes, el. 
 Chiquita Lake, el. 
 Cirque Lake, el. 
 Clear Lake, el. 
 Cliff Lake, el. 
 Cliff Lake, el. 
 Comet Lake, el. 
 Coney Lake, el. 
 Cradle Lakes, el. 
 Crag Lake, el. 
 Crockett Lake, el. 
 Crystal Lake, el. 
 Curly Lake, el. 
 Dead Lakes, el. 
 Deep Lake, el. 
 Diamond Lake, el. 
 Dome Lake, el. 
 Dry Lake, el. 
 Dude Lake, el. 
 Dutchman Lake, el. 
 Earthquake Lake, el. 
 Echo Lake, el. 
 Ennis Lake, el. 
 Expedition Lake, el. 
 Fault Lake, el. 
 Finger Lake, el. 
 Freezeout Lakes, el. 
 Globe Lake, el. 
 Gneiss Lake, el. 
 Gnome Lake, el. 
 Goose Lake, el. 
 Granite Lake, el. 
 Grassy Lake, el. 
 Haypress Lakes, el. 
 Heart Lake, el. 
 Hermit Lake, el. 
 Hidden Lake, el. 
 High Hope Lake, el. 
 Hilgard Lake, el. 
 Hollow Top Lake, el. 
 Jackson Lake, el. 
 Jerome Rock Lakes, el. 
 Kid Lake, el. 
 Lake Cameron, el. 
 Lake Eglise, el. 
 Lake Ha Hand, el. 
 Lake Levinsky, el. 
 Lake Solitude, el. 
 Lightning Lake, el. 
 Little Brother Lake, el. 
 Little Pine Lakes, el. 
 Little Sister Lake, el. 
 Lizard Lakes, el. 
 Lone Acre Lake, el. 
 Lost Cabin Lake, el. 
 Lost Lake, el. 
 Louise Lake, el. 
 Lower Boulder Lake, el. 
 Lower Falls Creek Lake, el. 
 Macaroni Lake, el. 
 Marcheta Lake, el. 
 Margo Lake, el. 
 McKelvey Lake, el. 
 Mine Lake, el. 
 Mirror Lake, el. 
 Moose Lake, el. 
 Mud Lake, el. 
 Noble Lake, el. 
 Otter Lake, el. 
 Oval Lake, el. 
 Painted Lake, el. 
 Rainbow Lakes, el. 
 Ramona Lake, el. 
 Red Lake, el. 
 Reservoir Lake, el. 
 Rock Creek Lake, el. 
 Romy Lake, el. 
 Rossiter Lake, el. 
 Sailor Lake, el. 
 Second Lower Falls Creek Lake, el. 
 Secret Lakes, el. 
 Sedge Lake, el. 
 Shadow Lake, el. 
 Sheep Lake, el. 
 Skytop Lake, el. 
 Smith Lake, el. 
 Snake Lake, el. 
 South Meadow Creek Lake, el. 
 Spanish Lakes, el. 
 Speck Lake, el. 
 Summit Lake, el. 
 Sunset Lake, el. 
 Sureshot Lake, el. 
 Swan Lake, el. 
 Tallus Lake, el. 
 Talus Lake, el. 
 Thunderbolt Lake, el. 
 Triangle Lake, el. 
 Triple Lakes, el. 
 Trudau Lake, el. 
 Twin Lakes, el. 
 Twin Lakes, el. 
 Twin Lakes, el. 
 Ulerys Lakes, el. 
 Upper Boulder Lake, el. 
 Upper Falls Creek Lake, el. 
 Upper Mason Lake, el. 
 Upper Sureshot Lake, el. 
 Wade Lake, el. 
 Wall Creek Lake, el. 
 Yellow Bear Lake, el.

Reservoirs
 Albro Lake, el. 
 Bell Lake, el. 
 Bismark Reservoir, el. 
 Call Road Reservoir, el. 
 Camp Creek Reservoir, el. 
 Camp Reservoir, el. 
 Cedar Lake, el. 
 Deep Lake, el. 
 Doubtful Reservoir, el. 
 Durham Reservoir, el. 
 Hill Reservoir, el. 
 Jackson Lake, el. 
 Kelly Reservoir, el. 
 Lake Ennis, el. 
 Lower Branham Lake, el. 
 Mason Lake, el. 
 Miller Reservoir, el. 
 Nelson Reservoir, el. 
 No Man Lake, el. 
 Noble Lake, el. 
 Ruby River Reservoir, el. 
 Smith Reservoir, el. 
 South Meadow Lake, el. 
 Sunrise Lake, el. 
 Tate Reservoir, el. 
 Thompson Reservoir, el. 
 Upper Branham Lake, el. 
 Willow Creek Reservoir, el. 
 Ziegler Reservoir, el.

See also
 List of lakes in Montana

Notes

 
Madison